Mighty-O Donuts is a chain of doughnut cafe restaurants and a doughnut wholesaler in Seattle, Washington, founded in 2000. Their donuts and toppings exclude artificial colors, dyes, additives, and preservatives. The chain bakes and sells donuts at five locations in the area. Mighty-O sells various to-go coffee items, coffee bean blends, and merchandise.

Locations 
As of January 2022, Mighty-O Donuts has five locations in the greater Seattle area. The first cafe is located in the Keystone Building in Tangletown, part of Seattle's Wallingford neighborhood, and was opened in 2003. Locations in Ballard and Capitol Hill were added in 2015. There is also a location in Green Lake. The most recent location in the Denny Triangle area opened in 2017. The most recent location was opened in 2018 and is located on 2nd & Madison in Seattle. Mighty-O gives tours of their facilities to the public, which range from tours booked by schools to family tours. The company is in the works of replacing a parking spot with a park-let in front of their Ballard location.

Founding 
The company was founded at a street fair in the University District of Seattle, Washington, by Ryan Kellner. Before opening up their first store front, Mighty-O Donuts began as a vendor at local Seattle street fairs and farmers markets, and sold their first donut at the University District Street Fair in 2000. In 2001, the company set up their first kitchen and began doing wholesale donut deliveries in the Seattle area. Mighty-O was founded based on the core values of providing the community with organic, non-GMO, vegan, affordable, and sustainable donuts.

Community involvement 

The company donates some of its earnings to educational and non-profit organizations. In addition, Mighty-O's work to strengthen the Seattle community is demonstrated through its participation in Bicycle Benefits and donating all excess unsold donuts to area hospitals, food pantries and non-profit events. One of their missions is to give back to the community by feeding the hungry. Their website brings awareness to hunger, specifically in Washington State, and highlights ways that the company works to combat this. Mighty-O works with local non-profit community outreach programs, including Operation Sack Lunch, to help combat hunger by donating their doughnuts to them. Mighty-O holds progressive values, and has shown support for social justice movements, including Black Lives Matter and the LGBTQ+ community. Their support has been shown through their social media pages, company website, and donations to several causes. As a company, they have also called attention to the COVID-19 pandemic, and made efforts to ensure the safety of their employees and customers. Mighty-O sells a Covid-Relief Blend Coffee called 'We Got This Seattle' available at their Green Lake, Ballard, and Capitol Hill locations, and donates $2 from every bag sold to Seattle Foundation's COVID-19 Response Fund. Their website features several feed posts that highlight the importance of earth-friendly practices, with the goal of educating their audiences on how to be more sustainable. These posts include ways that people can engage in sustainable practices at home, as well as highlight ways that the company works to reduce their carbon footprint. In 2019, 5 years after the deadly 2014 mudslide near Oso, Washington, Mighty-O donated $4,000 to help build the Oso Landslide Memorial.

Recognition 
In 2010 the food magazine Bon Appétit named Mighty-O one of the ten best donut shops in the United States. It also received a $10,000 prize for the best donuts in the televised Food Network Challenge: Donut Champions, filmed in November 2010. In 2014, PETA named Mighty-O the best vegan-friendly donut shop in the US

Notes

References
 Mighty-O, Top Pot, People's Cake: Food Network challengers, The Seattle Times, April 7, 2011
 How a Mighty-O Donuts Baker Beats All on Food Network, City's Best, April 14th 2011
 Holey Shit: Mighty-O's Vegan Donut Delight, Seattle Weekly, May 2 2011 
"Mighty-O Donuts". Seattle Met. Retrieved 2022-01-28.
 "These Seattle Restaurants Are Offering Delivery and Takeout Specials and Promotions". EverOut Seattle. Retrieved 2022-01-29.
 "We Got This, Seattle: A Running List of Hope Across the City". Seattle Met. Retrieved 2022-01-29.
 "Mighty-O donates $4,000 to help build Oso Landslide Memorial". FOX13 News Seattle Washington KCPQ. 2019-08-15. Retrieved 2022-01-29.

External links

 

Coffeehouses and cafés in the United States
Food and drink companies based in Seattle
Restaurants established in 2000
Doughnut shops in the United States
2000 establishments in Washington (state)
Wallingford, Seattle